Ferryside railway station serves the seaside village of Ferryside, Carmarthenshire, Wales. The station was opened by the South Wales Railway on 11 October 1852 and is now an unmanned request stop.

There is a level crossing near the station as well as a manually operated signal box, which in 2016 was listed as being due for computerisation. The 1905 Ordnance Survey map shows the presence of a goods shed with a single line running through it and points at either side leading on to the main line. In July 2015, the Welsh Government funded the installation of reinforced glass fibre 'humps' on the platforms to improve access for wheelchair and pushchair users onto and off trains.

Services
There is a basic two-hourly service in each direction (with extras at peak periods). Services are less frequent on Sundays.

References in popular culture 
Ferryside station was featured in the Channel 4 series Paul Merton's Secret Stations Season 1 Episode 2 broadcast on 8 May 2016. This series features British comedian Paul Merton visiting various request stop railway stations around Britain.

References

External links

A Video visual survey of the station

Railway stations in Carmarthenshire
DfT Category F2 stations
Former Great Western Railway stations
Railway stations in Great Britain opened in 1852
Railway stations served by Transport for Wales Rail
Railway request stops in Great Britain
1852 establishments in Wales